Santosh Kumar Biswas is a Awami League politician and the former Member of Parliament of Faridpur-12.

Career
Biswas was elected to parliament from Faridpur-12 as an Awami League candidate in 1973.

References

Awami League politicians
Living people
1st Jatiya Sangsad members
Year of birth missing (living people)